Akim Swedru is a town and the capital of Birim South District, a district in the Eastern Region of south Ghana. Akim Swedru has a 2013 settlement population of 10,379 people.

People
The people of Akim Swedru belong to the Akyem people. The are one of the groups which make up the Akan people in Ghana.

Location
To the northwest of Swedru is Aduasa. To the north is a village called Jedem and spanning from northeast to the east is Akim Oda, the district capital. Other towns and villages to the east are Ewisa, Akim Asawaase, Ntutumerim, Anyinam, Aboabo, Asene, Batabe, Manso, Asuboa and Anamasi. To the south are Akyease and Aperade.

Geography
Akim Swedru is located around a lot of hills, streams and rivers. There are 2 peak rain seasons during May–June and September–October. The relative humidity ranges from 56% during the dry season and 70% during the rainy season. The town lies within a semi-deciduous rainforest region.

See also
Birim South District

References

External links
 Birim South district

Populated places in the Eastern Region (Ghana)